The Seattle Chinese Times is a United States-based free bilingual weekly newspaper which was launched its first edition in May 2004 by Deng Rihua (邓日华).  

The contents comprise news reports, and editorials concerning the lifestyle and culture of the Chinese/Asian ethnic group in the Greater Puget Sound and Vancouver, British Columbia, Canada in the northwest.

In January 2005, the Seattle Chinese Times introduced a full-color edition, the first full-color weekly newspaper in the Chinese community. That same year saw the introduction of the "Canada Section", featuring events and activities in Canada; restaurants, entertainment, feature articles, and celebrity interviews. In April 2007, the Northwest Edition, Greater Seattle Edition and Metropolitan Edition were launched.

Profile
 Language: Chinese and English
 Size:    11.5 inches (W) × 20.25 inches (H)
 Audience:     Chinese/Asian and general community
 Frequency:    Weekly, published on Thursday
 Circulation:  520,000+ copies annually
 Distribution: Available at newsstands, restaurants, grocery stores and retail locations

Distribution
USA – 520,000 copies+ yearly
 Washington
 King County:
 Chinatown-International District, Seattle
 Shoreline, Northgate, Lynnwood, Edmonds (North), Bellevue, Factoria, Redmond (East)
 Renton, Kent, Federal Way (South)
 Pierce County, Tacoma, Vancouver (WA)
 Portland, Oregon

See also 
 History of the Chinese Americans in Seattle

References

External links 
 Seattle Chinese Times website

Newspapers published in Seattle
Chinese-American culture in Seattle
Chinese-language newspapers published in the United States
Bilingual newspapers
Non-English-language newspapers published in Washington (state)